Bless Its Pointed Little Head is a live album by Jefferson Airplane recorded at both the Fillmore East and West in the fall of 1968 and released in 1969 as RCA Victor LSP-4133.

Five songs on the album had not appeared on any of the band's previous studio recordings. Many of the Airplane's recordings on the live album were longer than their studio performances. The performance emphasized their vocal harmonies and revealed a harder rocking group. Guitar and bass lines were more in-depth in their construction, revealing complex instrumentals. However, some of the band's hit singles, such as "White Rabbit", were not included. It distinguished a different focus in their live concerts compared to their studio albums.

Track listing

On the back cover of the LP (RCA LSP-4133), "3/5 of a Mile in 10 Seconds" is identified as "3/5's Of a Mile in 10 Seconds".

"Clergy" contains an extract from the soundtrack of the 1933 film King Kong.

Personnel
Jefferson Airplane
Marty Balin – vocals, bass on "Fat Angel"
Jack Casady – bass, rhythm guitar on "Fat Angel"
Spencer Dryden – drums
Paul Kantner – vocals, rhythm guitar, second lead guitar on "Fat Angel"
Jorma Kaukonen – lead guitar, vocals
Grace Slick – vocals

Production
Al Schmitt – producer
Rich Schmitt – engineer
Pat Ieraci – beret
Jim Smircich – cover photography
Bill Thompson – poster
Gary Blackman – art direction

Charts
Album

Single

General references

References

1969 live albums
Albums produced by Al Schmitt
Jefferson Airplane live albums
Albums recorded at the Fillmore
Live at the Fillmore East albums
RCA Victor live albums
Acid rock albums